Radium is a chemical element with the symbol Ra and atomic number 88. It is the sixth element in group 2 of the periodic table, also known as the alkaline earth metals. Pure radium is silvery-white, but it readily reacts with nitrogen (rather than oxygen) upon exposure to air, forming a black surface layer of radium nitride (Ra3N2). All isotopes of radium are radioactive, the most stable isotope being radium-226 with a half-life of 1,600 years. When radium decays, it emits ionizing radiation as a by-product, which can excite fluorescent chemicals and cause radioluminescence.

Radium, in the form of radium chloride, was discovered by Marie and Pierre Curie in 1898 from ore mined at Jáchymov. They extracted the radium compound from uraninite and published the discovery at the French Academy of Sciences five days later. Radium was isolated in its metallic state by Marie Curie and André-Louis Debierne through the electrolysis of radium chloride in 1911.

In nature, radium is found in uranium and (to a lesser extent) thorium ores in trace amounts as small as a seventh of a gram per ton of uraninite. Radium is not necessary for living organisms, and adverse health effects are likely when it is incorporated into biochemical processes because of its radioactivity and chemical reactivity. , other than its use in nuclear medicine, radium has no commercial applications. Formerly, around the 1950s, it was used as a radioactive source for radioluminescent devices and also in radioactive quackery for its supposed curative power.

Bulk properties
Radium is the heaviest known alkaline earth metal and is the only radioactive member of its group. Its physical and chemical properties most closely resemble its lighter congener, barium.

Pure radium is a volatile silvery-white metal, although its lighter congeners calcium, strontium, and barium have a slight yellow tint. This tint rapidly vanishes on exposure to air, yielding a black layer of what is probably radium nitride (Ra3N2). Both of these values are slightly lower than those of barium, confirming periodic trends down the group 2 elements. Like barium and the alkali metals, radium crystallizes in the body-centered cubic structure at standard temperature and pressure: the radium–radium bond distance is 514.8 picometers. Radium has a density of 5.5 g/cm3, higher than that of barium, again confirming periodic trends; the radium-barium density ratio is comparable to the radium-barium atomic mass ratio, due to the two elements' similar crystal structures.

Isotopes

Radium has 33 known isotopes, with mass numbers from 202 to 234: all of them are radioactive. Four of these – 223Ra (half-life 11.4 days), 224Ra (3.64 days), 226Ra (1600 years), and 228Ra (5.75 years) – occur naturally in the decay chains of primordial thorium-232, uranium-235, and uranium-238 (223Ra from uranium-235, 226Ra from uranium-238, and the other two from thorium-232). These isotopes nevertheless still have half-lives too short to be primordial radionuclides and only exist in nature from these decay chains. Together with the mostly artificial 225Ra (15 d), which occurs in nature only as a decay product of minute traces of neptunium-237, these are the five most stable isotopes of radium. All other 27 known radium isotopes have half-lives under two hours, and the majority have half-lives under a minute. At least 12 nuclear isomers have been reported; the most stable of them is radium-205m, with a half-life between 130 and 230 milliseconds; this is still shorter than twenty-four ground-state radium isotopes.

In the early history of the study of radioactivity, the different natural isotopes of radium were given different names. In this scheme, 223Ra was named actinium X (AcX), 224Ra thorium X (ThX), 226Ra radium (Ra), and 228Ra mesothorium 1 (MsTh1). When it was realized that all of these are isotopes of the same element, many of these names fell out of use, and "radium" came to refer to all isotopes, not just 226Ra. Some of radium-226's decay products received historical names including "radium", ranging from radium A to radium G, with the letter indicating approximately how far they were down the chain from their parent 226Ra. Radium emanation = 222Rn, RaA = 218Po, RaB = 214Pb, RaC = 214Bi, RaC1 = 214Po, RaC2 = 210Tl, RaD = 210Pb, RaE = 210Bi, RaF = 210Po and RaG = 206Pb.

226Ra is the most stable isotope of radium and is the last isotope in the (4n + 2) decay chain of uranium-238 with a half-life of over a millennium: it makes up almost all of natural radium. Its immediate decay product is the dense radioactive noble gas radon (specifically the isotope 222Rn), which is responsible for much of the danger of environmental radium. It is 2.7 million times more radioactive than the same molar amount of natural uranium (mostly uranium-238), due to its proportionally shorter half-life.

A sample of radium metal maintains itself at a higher temperature than its surroundings because of the radiation it emits – alpha particles, beta particles, and gamma rays. More specifically, natural radium (which is mostly 226Ra) emits mostly alpha particles, but other steps in its decay chain (the uranium or radium series) emit alpha or beta particles, and almost all particle emissions are accompanied by gamma rays.

In 2013, it was discovered at CERN that the nucleus of radium-224 is pear-shaped using a technique called coulomb excitation. This was the first discovery of an asymmetric nucleus. This is a strong circumstantial evidence that certain heavy, unstable atomic nuclei have distorted nuclei, in this case, a pear shape.

Chemistry
Radium, like barium, is a highly reactive metal and always exhibits its group oxidation state of +2. It forms the colorless Ra2+ cation in aqueous solution, which is highly basic and does not form complexes readily. Most radium compounds are therefore simple ionic compounds, though participation from the 6s and 6p electrons (in addition to the valence 7s electrons) is expected due to relativistic effects and would enhance the covalent character of radium compounds such as RaF2 and RaAt2. For this reason, the standard electrode potential for the half-reaction Ra2+ (aq) + 2e− → Ra (s) is −2.916 V, even slightly lower than the value −2.92 V for barium, whereas the values had previously smoothly increased down the group (Ca: −2.84 V; Sr: −2.89 V; Ba: −2.92 V). The values for barium and radium are almost exactly the same as those of the heavier alkali metals potassium, rubidium, and caesium.

Compounds
Solid radium compounds are white as radium ions provide no specific coloring, but they gradually turn yellow and then dark over time due to self-radiolysis from radium's alpha decay. Insoluble radium compounds coprecipitate with all barium, most strontium, and most lead compounds.

Radium oxide (RaO) has not been characterized well past its existence, despite oxides being common compounds for the other alkaline earth metals. Radium hydroxide (Ra(OH)2) is the most readily soluble among the alkaline earth hydroxides and is a stronger base than its barium congener, barium hydroxide. It is also more soluble than actinium hydroxide and thorium hydroxide: these three adjacent hydroxides may be separated by precipitating them with ammonia.

Radium chloride (RaCl2) is a colorless, luminous compound. It becomes yellow after some time due to self-damage by the alpha radiation given off by radium when it decays. Small amounts of barium impurities give the compound a rose color. It is soluble in water, though less so than barium chloride, and its solubility decreases with increasing concentration of hydrochloric acid. Crystallization from aqueous solution gives the dihydrate RaCl2·2H2O, isomorphous with its barium analog.

Radium bromide (RaBr2) is also a colorless, luminous compound. In water, it is more soluble than radium chloride. Like radium chloride, crystallization from aqueous solution gives the dihydrate RaBr2·2H2O, isomorphous with its barium analog. The ionizing radiation emitted by radium bromide excites nitrogen molecules in the air, making it glow. The alpha particles emitted by radium quickly gain two electrons to become neutral helium, which builds up inside and weakens radium bromide crystals. This effect sometimes causes the crystals to break or even explode.

Radium nitrate (Ra(NO3)2) is a white compound that can be made by dissolving radium carbonate in nitric acid. As the concentration of nitric acid increases, the solubility of radium nitrate decreases, an important property for the chemical purification of radium.

Radium forms much the same insoluble salts as its lighter congener barium: it forms the insoluble sulfate (RaSO4, the most insoluble known sulfate), chromate (RaCrO4), carbonate (RaCO3), iodate (Ra(IO3)2), tetrafluoroberyllate (RaBeF4), and nitrate (Ra(NO3)2). With the exception of the carbonate, all of these are less soluble in water than the corresponding barium salts, but they are all isostructural to their barium counterparts. Additionally, radium phosphate, oxalate, and sulfite are probably also insoluble, as they coprecipitate with the corresponding insoluble barium salts. The great insolubility of radium sulfate (at 20 °C, only 2.1 mg will dissolve in 1 kg of water) means that it is one of the less biologically dangerous radium compounds. The large ionic radius of Ra2+ (148 pm) results in weak complexation and poor extraction of radium from aqueous solutions when not at high pH.

Occurrence
All isotopes of radium have half-lives much shorter than the age of the Earth, so that any primordial radium would have decayed long ago. Radium nevertheless still occurs in the environment, as the isotopes 223Ra, 224Ra, 226Ra, and 228Ra are part of the decay chains of natural thorium and uranium isotopes; since thorium and uranium have very long half-lives, these daughters are continually being regenerated by their decay. Of these four isotopes, the longest-lived is 226Ra (half-life 1600 years), a decay product of natural uranium. Because of its relative longevity, 226Ra is the most common isotope of the element, making up about one part per trillion of the Earth's crust; essentially all natural radium is 226Ra. Thus, radium is found in tiny quantities in the uranium ore uraninite and various other uranium minerals, and in even tinier quantities in thorium minerals. One ton of pitchblende typically yields about one seventh of a gram of radium. One kilogram of the Earth's crust contains about 900 picograms of radium, and one liter of sea water contains about 89 femtograms of radium.

History

Radium was discovered by Marie Skłodowska-Curie and her husband Pierre Curie on 21 December 1898, in a uraninite (pitchblende) sample from Jáchymov. While studying the mineral earlier, the Curies removed uranium from it and found that the remaining material was still radioactive. In July 1898, while studying pitchblende, they isolated an element similar to bismuth which turned out to be polonium. They then isolated a radioactive mixture consisting of two components: compounds of barium, which gave a brilliant green flame color, and unknown radioactive compounds which gave carmine spectral lines that had never been documented before. The Curies found the radioactive compounds to be very similar to the barium compounds, except they were less soluble. This discovery made it possible for the Curies to isolate the radioactive compounds and discover a new element in them. The Curies announced their discovery to the French Academy of Sciences on 26 December 1898. The naming of radium dates to about 1899, from the French word radium, formed in Modern Latin from radius (ray): this was in recognition of radium's power of emitting energy in the form of rays.

In September 1910, Marie Curie and André-Louis Debierne announced that they had isolated radium as a pure metal through the electrolysis of pure radium chloride (RaCl2) solution using a mercury cathode, producing radium–mercury amalgam. This amalgam was then heated in an atmosphere of hydrogen gas to remove the mercury, leaving pure radium metal. Later that same year, E. Eoler isolated radium by thermal decomposition of its azide, Ra(N3)2. Radium metal was first industrially produced at the beginning of the 20th century by Biraco, a subsidiary company of Union Minière du Haut Katanga (UMHK) in its Olen plant in Belgium.

The general historical unit for radioactivity, the curie, is based on the radioactivity of 226Ra: it was originally defined as the radioactivity of one gram of radium-226, but the definition was later slightly refined to be .

Historical applications

Luminescent paint

Radium was formerly used in self-luminous paints for watches, nuclear panels, aircraft switches, clocks, and instrument dials. A typical self-luminous watch that uses radium paint contains around 1 microgram of radium. In the mid-1920s, a lawsuit was filed against the United States Radium Corporation by five dying "Radium Girls" – dial painters who had painted radium-based luminous paint on the dials of watches and clocks. The dial painters were instructed to lick their brushes to give them a fine point, thereby ingesting radium. Their exposure to radium caused serious health effects which included sores, anemia, and bone cancer.

During the litigation, it was determined that the company's scientists and management had taken considerable precautions to protect themselves from the effects of radiation, but it did not seem to protect their employees. Additionally, for several years the companies had attempted to cover up the effects and avoid liability by insisting that the Radium Girls were instead suffering from syphilis. This complete disregard for employee welfare had a significant impact on the formulation of occupational disease labor law.

As a result of the lawsuit, the adverse effects of radioactivity became widely known, and radium-dial painters were instructed in proper safety precautions and provided with protective gear. In particular, dial painters no longer licked paint brushes to shape them (which caused some ingestion of radium salts). Radium was still used in dials as late as the 1960s, but there were no further injuries to dial painters. This highlighted that the harm to the Radium Girls could easily have been avoided.

From the 1960s the use of radium paint was discontinued. In many cases luminous dials were implemented with non-radioactive fluorescent materials excited by light; such devices glow in the dark after exposure to light, but the glow fades. Where long-lasting self-luminosity in darkness was required, safer radioactive promethium-147 (half-life 2.6 years) or tritium (half-life 12 years) paint was used; both continue to be used as of 2004. These had the added advantage of not degrading the phosphor over time, unlike radium. Tritium emits very low-energy beta radiation (even lower-energy than the beta radiation emitted by promethium) which cannot penetrate the skin, rather than the penetrating gamma radiation of radium, and is regarded as safer.

Clocks, watches, and instruments dating from the first half of the 20th century, often in military applications, may have been painted with radioactive luminous paint. They are usually no longer luminous; however, this is not due to radioactive decay of the radium (which has a half-life of 1600 years) but to the fluorescence of the zinc sulfide fluorescent medium being worn out by the radiation from the radium. The appearance of an often thick layer of green or yellowish brown paint in devices from this period suggests a radioactive hazard. The radiation dose from an intact device is relatively low and usually not an acute risk; but the paint is dangerous if released and inhaled or ingested.

Commercial use

Radium was once an additive in products such as toothpaste, hair creams, and even food items due to its supposed curative powers. Such products soon fell out of vogue and were prohibited by authorities in many countries after it was discovered they could have serious adverse health effects. (See, for instance, Radithor or Revigator types of "radium water" or "Standard Radium Solution for Drinking".) Spas featuring radium-rich water are still occasionally touted as beneficial, such as those in Misasa, Tottori, Japan. In the U.S., nasal radium irradiation was also administered to children to prevent middle-ear problems or enlarged tonsils from the late 1940s through the early 1970s.

Medical use

Radium (usually in the form of radium chloride or radium bromide) was used in medicine to produce radon gas, which in turn was used as a cancer treatment; for example, several of these radon sources were used in Canada in the 1920s and 1930s. However, many treatments that were used in the early 1900s are not used anymore because of the harmful effects radium bromide exposure caused. Some examples of these effects are anaemia, cancer, and genetic mutations. , safer gamma emitters such as 60Co, which is less costly and available in larger quantities, are usually used to replace the historical use of radium in this application.

Early in the 1900s, biologists used radium to induce mutations and study genetics. As early as 1904, Daniel MacDougal used radium in an attempt to determine whether it could provoke sudden large mutations and cause major evolutionary shifts. Thomas Hunt Morgan used radium to induce changes resulting in white-eyed fruit flies.
Nobel-winning biologist Hermann Muller briefly studied the effects of radium on fruit fly mutations before turning to more affordable x-ray experiments.

Howard Atwood Kelly, one of the founding physicians of Johns Hopkins Hospital, was a major pioneer in the medical use of radium to treat cancer. His first patient was his own aunt in 1904, who died shortly after surgery. Kelly was known to use excessive amounts of radium to treat various cancers and tumors. As a result, some of his patients died from radium exposure. His method of radium application was inserting a radium capsule near the affected area, then sewing the radium "points" directly to the tumor. This was the same method used to treat Henrietta Lacks, the host of the original HeLa cells, for cervical cancer. As of 2015, safer and more available radioisotopes are used instead.

Production

Uranium had no large scale application in the late 19th century and therefore no large uranium mines existed. In the beginning the only large source for uranium ore was the silver mines in Jáchymov, Austria-Hungary (now Czech Republic). The uranium ore was only a byproduct of the mining activities.

In the first extraction of radium, Curie used the residues after extraction of uranium from pitchblende. The uranium had been extracted by dissolution in sulfuric acid leaving radium sulfate, which is similar to barium sulfate but even less soluble in the residues. The residues also contained rather substantial amounts of barium sulfate which thus acted as a carrier for the radium sulfate. The first steps of the radium extraction process involved boiling with sodium hydroxide, followed by hydrochloric acid treatment to minimize impurities of other compounds. The remaining residue was then treated with sodium carbonate to convert the barium sulfate into barium carbonate (carrying the radium), thus making it soluble in hydrochloric acid. After dissolution, the barium and radium were reprecipitated as sulfates; this was then repeated to further purify the mixed sulfate. Some impurities that form insoluble sulfides were removed by treating the chloride solution with hydrogen sulfide, followed by filtering. When the mixed sulfates were pure enough, they were once more converted to mixed chlorides; barium and radium thereafter were separated by fractional crystallisation while monitoring the progress using a spectroscope (radium gives characteristic red lines in contrast to the green barium lines), and the electroscope.

After the isolation of radium by Marie and Pierre Curie from uranium ore from Jáchymov, several scientists started to isolate radium in small quantities. Later, small companies purchased mine tailings from Jáchymov mines and started isolating radium. In 1904, the Austrian government nationalised the mines and stopped exporting raw ore. Until 1912 when radium production increased, radium availability was low.

The formation of an Austrian monopoly and the strong urge of other countries to have access to radium led to a worldwide search for uranium ores. The United States took over as leading producer in the early 1910s. The Carnotite sands in Colorado provide some of the element, but richer ores are found in the Congo and the area of the Great Bear Lake and the Great Slave Lake of northwestern Canada. Neither of the deposits is mined for radium but the uranium content makes mining profitable.

The Curies' process was still used for industrial radium extraction in 1940, but mixed bromides were then used for the fractionation. If the barium content of the uranium ore is not high enough it is easy to add some to carry the radium. These processes were applied to high grade uranium ores but may not work well with low grade ores.

Small amounts of radium were still extracted from uranium ore by this method of mixed precipitation and ion exchange as late as the 1990s, but as of 2011, they are extracted only from spent nuclear fuel. The chief radium-producing countries are Belgium, Canada, the Czech Republic, Slovakia, the United Kingdom, and Russia. The amounts of radium produced were and are always relatively small; for example, in 1918, 13.6 g of radium were produced in the United States. The metal is isolated by reducing radium oxide with aluminium metal in a vacuum at 1,200 °C.

Modern applications

Radium is seeing increasing use in the field of atomic, molecular, and optical physics. Some radium isotopes, such as radium-225, have octupole deformed parity doublets that enhance sensitivity to charge parity violating new physics by two to three orders of magnitude compared to 199Hg.

Radium is also a promising candidate for trapped ion optical clocks. The radium ion has two subhertz-linewidth transitions from the  ground state that could serve as the clock transition in an optical clock. Additionally, radium is particularly well suited for a transportable optical clock as all transitions necessary for clock operation can be addressed with direct diode lasers at common wavelengths.

Though radium has no stable isotopes, there are eleven radium isotopes with half-lives longer than one minute that could be compared with high precision on a King plot. The degree of any potential nonlinearities in such a King plot could set bounds on new physics beyond the standard model.

Some of the few practical uses of radium are derived from its radioactive properties. More recently discovered radioisotopes, such as cobalt-60 and caesium-137, are replacing radium in even these limited uses because several of these isotopes are more powerful emitters, safer to handle, and available in more concentrated form.

The isotope 223Ra (the chloride is under the trade name Xofigo) was approved by the United States Food and Drug Administration in 2013 for use in medicine as a cancer treatment of bone metastasis. The main indication of treatment with Xofigo is the therapy of bony metastases from castration-resistant prostate cancer due to the favourable characteristics of this alpha-emitter radiopharmaceutical. 225Ra has also been used in experiments concerning therapeutic irradiation, as it is the only reasonably long-lived radium isotope which does not have radon as one of its daughters.

Radium is still used in 2007 as a radiation source in some industrial radiography devices to check for flawed metallic parts, similarly to X-ray imaging. When mixed with beryllium, radium acts as a neutron source. These RaBeF4-based (α, n) neutron sources have been deprecated despite the high number of neutrons they emit (1.84×106 neutrons per second) in favour of 241Am–Be sources. , the isotope 226Ra is mainly used to form 227Ac by neutron irradiation in a nuclear reactor.

Hazards
Radium is highly radioactive, and its immediate daughter, radon gas, is also radioactive. When ingested, 80% of the ingested radium leaves the body through the feces, while the other 20% goes into the bloodstream, mostly accumulating in the bones. This is because the body treats radium as calcium and deposits it in the bones, where radioactivity degrades marrow and can mutate bone cells. Exposure to radium, internal or external, can cause cancer and other disorders, because radium and radon emit alpha and gamma rays upon their decay, which kill and mutate cells. At the time of the Manhattan Project in 1944, the "tolerance dose" for workers was set at 0.1 micrograms of ingested radium.

Some of the biological effects of radium include the first case of "radium-dermatitis", reported in 1900, two years after the element's discovery. The French physicist Antoine Becquerel carried a small ampoule of radium in his waistcoat pocket for six hours and reported that his skin became ulcerated. Pierre and Marie Curie were so intrigued by radiation that they sacrificed their own health to learn more about it. Pierre Curie attached a tube filled with radium to his arm for ten hours, which resulted in the appearance of a skin lesion, suggesting the use of radium to attack cancerous tissue as it had attacked healthy tissue. Handling of radium has been blamed for Marie Curie's death due to aplastic anemia. A significant amount of radium's danger comes from its daughter radon: being a gas, it can enter the body far more readily than can its parent radium.

, 226Ra is considered to be the most toxic of the quantity radioelements, and it must be handled in tight glove boxes with significant airstream circulation that is then treated to avoid escape of its daughter 222Rn to the environment. Old ampoules containing radium solutions must be opened with care because radiolytic decomposition of water can produce an overpressure of hydrogen and oxygen gas. The Maximum Contaminant Level (MCL) for radium is 5pCi/L for drinking water, however, the OSHA doesn't set a exposure limit, as there is a radiation limit already set up.

See also

Notes

References

Bibliography

Further reading

External links

 
 Photos of Radium Water Bath in Oklahoma
 NLM Hazardous Substances Databank – Radium, Radioactive
 Annotated bibliography for radium from the Alsos Digital Library for Nuclear Issues 
 Radium at The Periodic Table of Videos (University of Nottingham)

 
Chemical elements
Alkaline earth metals
Chemical elements with body-centered cubic structure
Marie Curie
Pierre Curie